Ralioke is a village in Sialkot District of the Punjab province of Pakistan.

References

Villages in Sialkot District